The Human Connectome Project (HCP) is a five-year project sponsored by sixteen components of the National Institutes of Health, split between two consortia of research institutions. The project was launched in July 2009 as the first of three Grand Challenges of the NIH's Blueprint for Neuroscience Research. On September 15, 2010, the NIH announced that it would award two grants: $30 million over five years to a consortium led by Washington University in St. Louis and the University of Minnesota, with strong contributions from Oxford University (FMRIB) and $8.5 million over three years to a consortium led by Harvard University, Massachusetts General Hospital and the University of California Los Angeles.

The goal of the Human Connectome Project is to build a "network map" (connectome) that will shed light on the anatomical and functional connectivity within the healthy human brain, as well as to produce a body of data that will facilitate research into brain disorders such as dyslexia, autism, Alzheimer's disease, and schizophrenia.

WU-Minn-Oxford consortium
The WU-Minn-Oxford consortium developed improved MRI instrumentation, image acquisition and image analysis methods for mapping the connectivity in the human brain at spatial resolutions significantly better than previously available; using these methods, WU-Minn-Oxford consortium collected a large amount of MRI and behavioral data on 1,200 healthy adults — twin pairs and their siblings from 300 families - using a special 3 Tesla MRI instrument. In addition, it scanned 184 subjects from this pool at 7 Tesla, with higher spatial resolution. The data are being analyzed to show the anatomical and functional connections between parts of the brain for each individual, and will be related to behavioral test data. Comparing the connectomes and genetic data of genetically identical twins with fraternal twins will reveal the relative contributions of genes and environment in shaping brain circuitry and pinpoint relevant genetic variation. The maps will also shed light on how brain networks are organized.

Using a combination of non-invasive imaging technologies, including resting-state fMRI and task-based functional MRI, MEG and EEG, and diffusion MRI, the WU-Minn will be mapping connectomes at the macro scale — mapping large brain systems that can be divided into anatomically and functionally distinct areas, rather than mapping individual neurons.

Dozens of investigators and researchers from nine institutions have contributed to this project. Research institutions include: Washington University in St. Louis, the Center for Magnetic Resonance Research at the University of Minnesota, Oxford University, Saint Louis University, Indiana University, D'Annunzio University of Chieti–Pescara, Ernst Strungmann Institute, Warwick University, Advanced MRI Technologies, and the University of California at Berkeley.

The data that results from this research is being made publicly available in an open-source web-accessible neuroinformatics platform.

MGH/Harvard-UCLA consortium
The MGH/Harvard-UCLA consortium will focus on optimizing MRI technology for imaging the brain’s structural connections using diffusion MRI, with a goal of increasing spatial resolution, quality, and speed. Diffusion MRI, employed in both projects, maps the brain's fibrous long-distance connections by tracking the motion of water. Water diffusion patterns in different types of cells allow the detection of different types of tissues. Using this imaging method, the long extensions of neurons, called white matter, can be seen in sharp relief.

The new scanner built at the MGH Martinos Center for this project is "4 to 8 times as powerful as conventional systems, enabling imaging of human neuroanatomy with greater sensitivity than was previously possible." The scanner has a maximum gradient strength of 300 mT/m and a slew rate of 200 T/m/s, with b-values tested up to 20,000 s/mm^2. For comparison, a standard gradient coil is 45 mT/m.

Behavioral testing and measurement
To understand the relationship between brain connectivity and behavior better, the Human Connectome Project will use a reliable and well-validated battery of measures that assess a wide range of human functions. The core of its battery is the tools and methods developed by the NIH Toolbox for Assessment of Neurological and Behavioral function.

Research 
The Human Connectome Project has grown into a large group of research teams. These teams make use of the style of brain scanning developed by the Project. The studies usually include using large groups of participants, scanning many angles of participants' brains, and carefully documenting the location of the structures in each participant's brain. Studies affiliated with the Human Connectome Project are currently cataloged by the Connectome Coordination Facility. The studies fall into three categories: Healthy Adult Connectomes, Lifespan Connectome Data, and Connectomes Related to Human Disease. Under each of these categories are research groups working on specific questions.

Healthy Adult Connectomes 
 The Human Connectome Project Young Adult study made data on the brain connections of 1100 healthy young adults available to the scientific community. Scientists have used data from the study to support theories about which areas of the brain communicate with one another. For example, one study used data from the project to show that the amygdala, a part of the brain essential for emotional processing, is connected to the parts of the brain that receive information from the senses and plan movement. Another study showed that healthy individuals who had a high tendency to experience anxious or depressed mood had fewer connections between the amygdala and a number of brain areas related to attention.

Lifespan Connectome Data 
There are currently four research groups collecting data on connections in the brains of populations other than young adults. The purpose of these groups is to determine ordinary brain connectivity during infancy, childhood, adolescence, and aging. Scientists will use the data from these research groups in the same manner in which they have used data from the Human Connectome Project Young Adult study.

Connectomes Related to Human Disease 
Fourteen research groups investigate how connections in the brain change during the course of a particular disease. Four of the groups focus on Alzheimer's disease or dementia. Alzheimer's disease and dementia are diseases that begin during aging. Memory loss and cognitive impairment mark the progression of these diseases. While scientists consider Alzheimer's disease to be a disease with a specific cause, dementia actually describes symptoms which could be attributed to a number of causes. Two other research groups investigate how diseases that disrupt vision change connectivity in the brain. Another four of the research groups focus on anxiety disorders and major depressive disorder, psychological disorders that result in abnormal emotional regulation. Two more of the research groups focus on the effects of psychosis, a symptom of some psychological disorders in which an individual perceives reality differently than others do. One of the teams researches epilepsy, a disease characterized by seizures. Finally, one research team is documenting the brain connections of the Amish people, a religious and ethnic group that has high rates of some psychological disorders.

Although theories have been put forth about the way brain connections change in the diseases under investigation, many of these theories have been supported by data from healthy populations. For example, an analysis of the brains of healthy individuals supported the theory that individuals with anxiety disorders and depression have less connectivity between their emotional centers and the areas that govern attention. By collecting data specifically from individuals with these diseases, researchers hope to have a more certain idea of how brain connections in these individuals change over time.

Status 
The project has yet to be officially declared complete.

Useful links 
HCP wiki - Human Connectome Project wiki

ICA-FIX - Documentation on ICA-FIX algorithm used on resting state fMRI data

See also
 Connectome: How the Brain's Wiring Makes Us Who We Are
 Connectomics
 Connectogram
 Human Brain Project
 Outline of brain mapping
 Outline of the human brain
 Noogenesis

References

External links
 Official website of the Human Connectome Project
 Home of the Harvard/MGH-UCLA consortium Human Connectome Project
 
 
 The Human Connectome Project NIH Blueprint for Neuroscience Research
 The NITRC Human Connectome Project (HCP) at Neuroimaging Informatics Tools and Resources Clearinghouse (NITRC)
Related Connectome Projects
 The umbrella site for all Human Connectome Project work funded by the NIH
 Open Connectome Project
 on-line game tracing neurons in the retina EyeWire, a project developed by MIT and the Max Planck Institute for Medical Research
 developing Human Connectome Project The developing Human Connectome Project, a project led by King’s College London, Imperial College London and Oxford University, aims to make major scientific progress by creating the first 4-dimensional connectome of early life. 
Press releases
 
 
News reports
 
 
 
 

Cognitive neuroscience
Computational neuroscience
Neuroscience projects